The Sri Lanka Navy 50th Anniversary Medal (Sinhala: ශ්‍රී ලංකා නාවික හමුදා 50වන සංවත්සර පදක්කම Śrī Laṃkā nāvika hamudā panasvana sangwathsara padakkama) was presented to all ranks of the regular and volunteer servicepersons of the Sri Lanka Navy provided they have completed a minimum of ten years in service at any time during the period of 9 December 1999 to 8 December 2000, the year of the 50th anniversary of the Navy.

External links
Sri Lanka Navy
Ministry of Defence : Sri Lanka

References

Military awards and decorations of Sri Lanka
Awards established in 2000